Sumner Gage Whittier (July 4, 1911 – January 8, 2010) was an American politician who served two two-year terms as the 58th Lieutenant Governor for the Commonwealth of Massachusetts from 1953 to 1957.

Career 
Whittier was an Alderman in the City of Everett, a member of the Massachusetts House of Representatives, and a Massachusetts Senator. He graduated from Boston University in 1936.

Whittier was the Republican candidate for Governor in 1956, but lost to Democrat Foster Furcolo. He was then appointed by President Dwight D. Eisenhower to head the U.S. Veterans Administration, a position he held until 1961. Thereafter he headed SSI at the Social Security Administration in Baltimore and worked there until age 80.

Personal life 
Whittier lived in Ellicott City, Maryland. He died on January 8, 2010. The Sumner G. Whittier School in Everett is named in his honor.

See also
 Massachusetts legislature: 1941–1942, 1943–1944, 1945–1946, 1947–1948, 1949–1950, 1951–1952

References

External links 
2000 B.U. Alumni profile
Social Security History photo
90th birthday celebration, 2001
Obituary and tribute by Howard Phillips
Sumner G. Whittier's obituary, Legacy.com

|-

|-

1911 births
2010 deaths
Boston University alumni
Lieutenant Governors of Massachusetts
Massachusetts city council members
Republican Party Massachusetts state senators
Republican Party members of the Massachusetts House of Representatives
Politicians from Baltimore
Politicians from Everett, Massachusetts
United States Department of Veterans Affairs officials